The Hephthalite–Sasanian Wars were a series of conflicts between the Hephthalites and the Sasanian Empire.

See also
Great Wall of Gorgan, a defense system created to prevent further Hephthalite incursions
Bandian Fire Temple

Sources 
 
 
  

 
 
 

 

 
Battles involving the Hephthalites
Battles involving the Sasanian Empire
5th-century conflicts
6th-century conflicts
7th-century conflicts